Bosse Persson (25 September 1941 - 9 June 2014) was a Swedish political figure who created several frivolous political parties in Sweden, the most famous of which being the Donald Duck Party. He was also known as Malmö's own Santa Claus.

References

1941 births
2014 deaths
Politicians from Malmö
20th-century Swedish politicians